Motive for Movement was a Tulsa, Oklahoma indie rock band that formed in 2005. The band consisted of the 4 members now known as Foreign Home. The band has gone through many style shifts since 2005 but consistently combines angular guitar and syncopated drums for a style often described as ambient shoegazing indie rock with Britpop melodic sensibilities.

Played With 
 Copeland (band) (Tooth & Nail Records)
 Sparta (band) (Hollywood Records)
 Eagles of Death Metal
 Edison Glass (Credential Recordings)
 Dear and the Headlights (Equal Vision)
 Project 86 (Tooth & Nail Records)
 Showbread (Tooth & Nail Records)
 Inhale Exhale (Solid State Records)
 Vedera (Epic Records)
 The Ataris
 Capital Lights (Tooth & Nail Records)
 Umbrellas (band) (The Militia Group)
 Blinded Black (SideCho Records)
 Deas Vail (Mono Vs Stereo)
 Between the Trees (The Universal Motown/Universal Republic Group)
 Unwed Sailor (Burnt Toast Vinyl)
 Minutes Too Far (Doghouse Records)
 Hundred Year Storm (Floodgate)
 Other Lives (band) (TBD Records)
 Treaty of Paris (band)
 Eleventyseven (Gotee Records)
 The Valley Arena
 Meese (Atlantic Records)
 Le Meu Le Purr (TVT Records)
 Desole (Abacus Records)
 The Hanks
 The Forecast (Eyeball Records)
 PM Today (Rise Records)

Festivals
Diversafest 2008 with:
Paramore (Fueled by Ramen)
Phantom Planet (Fueled by Ramen)
The Roots (MCA Records)
Zappa Plays Zappa
Ghostland Observatory
Helmet
Clutch
The All-American Rejects (Interscope Records)
The Disco Biscuits
The Apples In Stereo (Simian)
moe.
Admiral Twin
Diversafest 2009 with:
The Black Crows
Cake (band)
Rooney (band)
The Cool Kids
Ozomatli
Metro Station (Columbia)
Blue October (Universal Records)
Other Lives (band) (TBD Records)
Ra Ra Riot
Delta Spirit
Citizen Cope
The Uglysuit
Gogol Bordello

References 

https://archive.today/20130223013257/http://www.inspirer.nu/news/2012/3/5/album-review-foreign-home-how-strange-the-night-ep.html

http://www.ktul.com/video?autoStart=true&topVideoCatNo=default&clipId=6753844

http://www.tulsaworld.com/webextra/content/2007/spotniks07/nom.aspx

http://www.tulsaworld.com/entertainment/article.aspx?articleID=071123_8_ES1_hCanc80780

http://www.tulsaworld.com/entertainment/article.aspx?articleID=071026_8_ES1_hrdan12057

http://www.tulsaworld.com/entertainment/spot/article.aspx?articleID=20080514_278_D8_spancl687362

https://web.archive.org/web/20080225100802/http://www.edgetulsa.com/music/homegroan.shtml

https://web.archive.org/web/20080223232555/http://www.tulsamusicpulse.com/index.php/category/tulsa-world/

http://hometownheroestulsa.libsyn.com/index.php?post_year=2007&post_month=04

http://hometownheroestulsa.libsyn.com/index.php?post_year=2006&post_month=08

https://web.archive.org/web/20080409153207/http://www.faragher-productions.com/2007/modules.php?name=Content&pa=showpage&pid=7

http://www.tulsaworld.com/webextra/blogs/weblog.aspx?column_id=29&bdate=9/1/2007

http://www.indiefy.com/motiveformovement

http://www.urbantulsa.com/gyrobase/Content?oid=oid%3A15072

http://paynecountylinenews.blogspot.com/2007_04_01_archive.html

http://eventful.com/events/kansas-city/music-vedera-walter-alias-motive-for-movement-/E0-001-005658977-0

http://www.answers.com/topic/cain-s-ballroom?cat=entertainment

https://web.archive.org/web/20080913003442/http://www.dfest.net/music.aspx

http://www.myspace.com/motiveformovement

http://www.purevolume.com/motiveformovement

https://web.archive.org/web/20081207183134/http://www.oklahomarock.com/blog/?cat=277

http://www.motiveformovement.com

http://www.virb.com/motiveformovement

http://www.digitalpodcast.com/detail-iROK_Radio-1776.html

http://www.indierockcafe.com/2010/10/indee-mail-new-songs-bands/

http://www.altpress.com/apr/

Indie rock musical groups from Oklahoma
Musical groups established in 2005